Shin Yu-bin (born December 25, 2001), known professionally as Swervy, is a South Korean rapper and songwriter. In 2021, she became the first female musician to win Best Rap Song at the Korean Music Awards with "Mama Lisa".

Early life 
Shin Yu-bin was studying in Russia when she was 12. She realized her talent in rapping when she sang along to Young Money's songs in the school festival. She then decided to be a rapper. She became interested in Korean hip hop after Swings called out fellow rappers on the beat of "Control". She took rap lessons from rapper JJK. She was influenced by Green Day, My Chemical Romance, and Panic! at the Disco. As "swerve" means "to avoid", she adopted the stage name "Swervy" because she wanted to live without doing what she did not want to do.

Career 
In 2017, Swervy released her debut single "Yaya" with rapper Eco Yard. In 2019, she signed to Hi-Lite Records. In 2020, she released her debut studio album Undercover Angel, which received critical acclaim. In 2021, she became the first female musician to win Best Rap Song at the Korean Music Awards with "Mama Lisa".

Philanthropy 
In 2022, Swervy donated 100 thousand masks to three children's centers.

Discography

Studio album

Filmography

TV

Awards and nominations

References

External link 

 

2001 births
Living people
Show Me the Money (South Korean TV series) contestants
South Korean women rappers